Cartonema spicatum is a herb in the Commelinaceae family.

It blooms between January and July producing yellow flowers.

It is found in the Kimberley region in Western Australia where it grows in a variety of soils over basalt or sandstone.

References

spicatum
Plants described in 1810
Taxa named by Robert Brown (botanist, born 1773)